Sri Dharmasthala Manjunatheshwara College of Ayurveda and Hospital (SDMCAH), Hassan, was established in the year 1992 by Veerendra Heggade as a part of SDM Educational Society. The college has Affiliation/Recognition from RGUHS, Bangalore and Central Council of Indian Medicine, New Delhi.

It is located in the state of Karnataka on the Bangalore to Mangalore highway (BM highway) about 2.4 km from the Hassan bus stand and about 187 km from the city of Bangalore.

The courses offered are B.A.M.S., Bachelor of Ayurvedic Medicine and Surgery, M.D(Ayu), Doctor in Medicine and M.S(Ayu), Masters in Surgery. PhD in Ayurvedic medicine and surgery. It is one of the Ayurveda institutes of India with highest number of Post graduate seats.

Colleges under SDM group include:
SDM College of Ayurveda, Hassan
SDM College of Dental Sciences, Dharwad
SDM College of Engineering and Technology
SDM Ayurveda Hospital, Hassan
SDM Industrial Training Institute, Sam
SDM Institute for Management Development, Mysore
SDM College of Naturopathy & Yogic Sciences, Ujire
SDM College, Ujire
SDM & MMK Mahila Maha Vidyala, Mysore
SDM Law College, Mangalore
SDM College of Business Management, Mangalore
SDM College of PGDBM Course, Mangalore
SDM College of Ayurveda, Udupi
SDM Ayurveda Pharmacy, Udupi
SDM Ayurveda Hospital, Udupi
SDM College of Physiotherapy, Dharwad
SDM College of Medical Sciences, Dharwad
SDM Industrial Training Institute, Venur

References

External links 
 

Ayurvedic colleges in Karnataka
Universities and colleges in Hassan district